HMS Warrior was a steam yacht, twice commissioned by the Royal Navy, which participated in both World Wars, as well as in the Spanish Civil War.  She was bombed and sunk in 1940.

Warrior
The 1,266-ton yacht, originally named Warrior, was built for Frederick William Vanderbilt in 1904 in Troon, Scotland by the Ailsa Shipbuilding Company; she was designed by G.L. Watson.  Powered by a twin triple-expansion T3-cylinder 15-knot 2-screw engine, later altered by A. & J. Inglis to a twin 4-cylinder triple expansion engine, she was 284 feet long, with a beam of 32 feet and a draught of 17 feet. She was also luxuriously furnished in eighteenth-century French style, and her accommodation included 6 guest staterooms.

In 1914, Warrior ran aground near the mouth of the Magdalena River in Colombia: her passengers, including Mr. and Mrs. Vanderbilt, the Duke and Duchess of Manchester, and Lord Falconer, were rescued and Warrior was eventually refloated.  She was purchased in 1916 from the estate of Alfred G. Vanderbilt (after he briefly owned her under the name Wayfarer) by Alexander Smith Cochran, who reverted to the name Warrior.

Warrior was requisitioned by the Royal Navy in 1917 and served as Admiral Sir W.L. Grant's flagship during a visit to Washington, DC in 1918, during which HMS Warrior took part in a Memorial Day ceremony honouring those who died at sea during the First World War, including the victims of RMS Lusitania.

Goizeko Izarra
A Basque entrepreneur, Sir Ramón de la Sota Llano, Marques de Llano, of Bilbao, Spain bought the yacht in 1920 and rechristened her with the Basque name Goizeko Izarra ("Morning Star").

HMS Warrior II
Sir Hugo Cunliffe-Owen purchased the yacht in 1937; she resumed her prior name, Warrior. She was requisitioned by the Royal Navy during the Second World War, fitted with two 12-pounder guns and named HMS Warrior II, since the once-innovative armoured frigate (at the time just a hulk)  resumed her name in 1923. In an air attack by over 50 Luftwaffe aircraft on 11 July 1940 Warrior II was bombed and sunk, with one casualty, in the English Channel. Her assailants were Junkers Ju 87 "Stuka" dive bombers from Sturzkampfgeschwader 2 [Dive Bomber Wing 2].

The wreck of Warrior II is now a popular destination for divers.

Notes

References
 The HMS Warrior Story, UK Ministry of Defence

1904 ships
Ships built on the River Clyde
World War II shipwrecks in the English Channel
Maritime incidents in July 1940
Steam yachts
World War I naval ships of the United Kingdom
World War II auxiliary ships of the United Kingdom
Ships sunk by German aircraft